Buggy is generally used to refer to any lightweight automobile with off road capabilities and sparse bodywork. Most are built either as a kit car or from scratch.

History

Originally used to describe very lightweight horse-drawn vehicles for one or two persons, the term was extended to lightweight automobiles as they became popular. As automobiles became increasingly sophisticated, the term briefly dropped out of use before being revived to describe more specialised off road vehicles.

Types

 Bennett buggy, a Canadian, depression era term for an automobile pulled by a horse
 Dune buggy, designed for use on sand dunes
 Baja Bug, a modified Volkswagen Beetle
 Moon buggy, nickname for the Lunar Roving Vehicle used on the Moon during the Apollo program's Apollo 15, Apollo 16, and Apollo 17 missions
 Sandrail, a variant of the dune buggy
 Swamp buggy, designed for use in swamps
 Rock buggy, designed for use in low-speed rock-crawling applications
 Rock bouncer, similar to rock buggy but custom built to handle obstacles more aggressively

See also

 American (1902 automobile)
 Buckeye gasoline buggy
 Citroën C-Buggy
 High wheeler
 Kite buggy
 Truggy
 Volkswagen 181
 Volkswagen Country Buggy

References

Car body styles
Off-road vehicles